"Re-Offender" is a song by Scottish alternative rock band Travis, released as the first single from their fourth studio album, 12 Memories. The single peaked at number seven on the UK Singles Chart. The lyrics depicts a relationship marred with domestic violence. An image similar to the single cover features on the inner sleeve of 12 Memories. The song is featured on One Tree Hill compilation album One Tree Hill – Music from the WB Television Series, Vol. 1.

Music video
The music video depicts the band playing small venues in and around Glasgow, during which time each band member in turn falls out with the other and they end up in a fight. The video was directed by Anton Corbijn.

Track listing
 UK CD1 
 "Re-Offender" – 3:47
 "Definition of Wrong" – 2:44
 "Enemy" – 3:22

 UK CD2
 "Re-Offender" – 3:47
 "The Sea" – 4:18
 "Don't Be Shy" – 4:46

 7" vinyl
 "Re-Offender" – 3:47
 "Definition of Wrong" – 2:44

Charts

References

2003 singles
2003 songs
Independiente (record label) singles
Song recordings produced by Tchad Blake
Songs written by Fran Healy (musician)
Travis (band) songs